Top Model, cycle 8 is the eight cycle of an ongoing reality television series based on Tyra Banks' America's Next Top Model that pits contestants from Poland against each other in a variety of competitions to determine who will win the title of the next Polish Top Model.

Joanna Krupa, who also serves as the lead judge, returned to host the eight cycle. Other judges included fashion designer Dawid Woliński, fashion show director Kasia Sokołowska and photographer Marcin Tyszka. This is the fifth season of the show to feature male contestants.

Among the prizes for the season are a contract with Models Plus Management, an appearance on the cover of the Polish issue of Glamour, and 100,000 złotys (US$30,000).

The international destinations this cycle were London, Moscow, Tel Aviv, Jerusalem, Istanbul and Havana. The winner of this competition was 20-year-old Dawid Woskanian from Kozy.

Contestants 
(Ages stated are at start of contest)

Episodes

Episode 1
Original airdate: 

Auditions for the eight season of Top Model begin, and aspiring hopefuls are chosen for the semi-final round.

Episode 2
Original airdate: 

In the semi-finals, the judges begin to eliminate contestants to narrow the number of models who will battle it out for a place in the top model house.

Golden ticket recipient: Klaudia El Dursi

Episode 3
Original airdate: 

In the third and final casting episode of the season, the judges choose the finalists who will move onto the main competition out of the remaining pool of contestants.

Names in bold represent eliminated semi-finalists

Episode 4
Original airdate: 

First call-out: Klaudia El Dursi
Bottom two: Nikola Furman & Radek Czekański
Eliminated: Radek Czekański
Guest judge: Magdalena Frackowiak
Featured photographer: Marcin Tyszka

Episode 5
Original airdate: 

First challenge winner: Kinga Wawrzyniak
Second challenge winners: Denis Chmielewski & Klaudia Chojnacka
First call-out: Ania Jaroszewska
Bottom three: Denis Chmielewski, Nikola Furman & Sandra Dorsz 
Disqualified: Denis Chmielewski
Featured photographers: Łukasz Dziewic & Robert Wolanski
Special guests: Julia Kuczyńska, Wujaszek Liestyle, Karolina Pisarek
Guest judge: Kasia Struss

Episode 6
Original airdate: 

Challenge winner/Immune from elimination: Kinga Wawrzyniak
Quit: Nikola Furman
First call-out: Dawid Woskanian
Bottom two: Magda Karwacka & Marcin Chowaniak
Eliminated: Magda Karwacka
Featured photographer: Marta Wojtal
Guest judge: Anna Jagodzińska

Episode 7
Original airdate: 

Wildcard: Kinga Dębska
Challenge winner: Olga Kleczkowska
First call-out:  Ania Jaroszewska & Staszek Obolewicz 
Bottom three: Kinga Dębska, Michał Gała & Rafał Torkowski
Eliminated: Kinga Dębska & Rafał Torkowski
Featured photographer: Magdalena Luniewska
Featured directors: Piotr Książek & Szymon Dudka
Special guests: Roksana Węgiel
Guest judge: Michał Koterski, Natasza Urbańska

Episode 8
Original airdate: 

First challenge winners: Klaudia El Dursi & Sandra Dorsz
Second challenge winners: Ania Jaroszewska, Kinga Wawrzyniak, Michał Gała & Staszek Obolewicz 
First call-out: Sandra Dorsz 
Bottom two: Marcin Chowaniak & Michał Gała
Eliminated: Marcin Chowaniak
Featured photographer: Iddo Lavie
Guest judge: Ranita Sobanska

Episode 9
Original airdate: 

First challenge winner: Olga Kleczkowska
Second challenge winners: Dawid Woskanian, Klaudia Chojnacka & Klaudia El Dursi 
First call-out: Kinga Wawrzyniak
Bottom two: Klaudia Chojnacka & Olga Kleczkowska
Eliminated: Klaudia Chojnacka
Featured director: Piotr Onopa
Featured photographer: Adam Plucinski
Special guests: Daria Zawiałow

Episode 10
Original airdate: 

First challenge winners: Kinga Wawrzyniak & Staszek Obolewicz
Second challenge winners: Ania Jaroszewska, Olga Kleczkowska & Staszek Obolewicz
Booked for a job: Kinga Wawrzyniak (Vogue Polska)
First call-out: Staszek Obolewicz 
Bottom three: Ania Jaroszewska, Klaudia El Dursi & Michał Gała
Eliminated: Ania Jaroszewska & Michał Gała
Featured photographers: Marcin Tyszka, Zuza Krajewska
Special guests: Małgorzata Kożuchowska, Adam Boguta, Adam Niedźwiedź, Ania Markowska, Franek Strąkowski, Hubert Gromadzki, Kasia Szklarczyk, Patryk Grudowicz, Żaklina Ta Dinh

Episode 11
Original airdate: 

Challenge winners:  Klaudia El Dursi & Staszek Obolewicz 
First call-out: Sandra Dorsz
Bottom two: Kinga Wawrzyniak & Klaudia El Dursi
Eliminated: Kinga Wawrzyniak
Featured photographer: Osman Ozel

Episode 12
Original airdate: 

First call-out: Olga Kleczkowska
Bottom three: Dawid Woskanian, Klaudia El Dursi & Staszek Obolewicz 
Eliminated: Klaudia El Dursi & Staszek Obolewicz 
Saved: Staszek Obolewicz
Featured photographer: Mehmet Erzincan

Episode 13
Original airdate: 

Final four: Dawid Woskanian, Olga Kleczkowska, Sandra Dorsz & Staszek Obolewicz 
Eliminated: Sandra Dorsz
Final three: Dawid Woskanian, Olga Kleczkowska & Staszek Obolewicz 
Poland's Next Top Model: Dawid Woskanian
Featured photographers: Marcin Klaban, Jacek Bonecki, Łukasz Pęcak
Finale host: Magda Mołek

Results 

 The contestant was immune from elimination
 The contestant was eliminated
 The contestant was disqualified
 The contestant quit the competition
 The contestant was originally eliminated but was saved.
 The contestant won the competition

Bottom Two/Three/Four 

 The contestant was eliminated after their first time in the bottom two
 The contestant was eliminated after their second time in the bottom two
 The contestant was eliminated after their third time in the bottom two
 The contestant quit the competition
 The contestant was disqualified
 The contestant was eliminated in the final judging and placed fourth.
 The contestant was eliminated in the final judging and placed third.
 The contestant was eliminated in the final judging and placed second.

Photo shoots
Episode 3 photo shoot: Group shots (semifinals) 
Episode 4 photo shoot: Jumping on a trampoline
Episode 5 photo shoot: Nude in ice
Episode 6 photo shoot: Folk village
Episode 7 video shoot: Roller disco
Episode 8 photo shoot: Tourists in Israel
Episode 9 photo shoot: Photo shoot with family
Episode 10 photo shoot: Vogue Polska
Episode 11 photo shoot: Streets of Istanbul
Episode 12 photo shoot: Istanbul creek
Episode 13 photo shoots: Glamour covers, Apart Jewelry campaign, Peugeot car ads

Ratings

References

 

Top Model (Polish TV series)
2018 in Polish television